Student syndrome refers to planned procrastination, when, for example, a student will only start to apply themselves to an assignment at the last possible moment before its deadline. This eliminates any potential safety margins and puts the person under stress and pressure. According to one academic source, it is done in order to induce a level of urgency high enough to ensure the proper amount of effort is put into the task.

The term is used to describe this form of procrastination in general, and not only by students. For example, in the field of software engineering: "This initial research investigates three behavioral issues which may affect team member productivity in both a traditional waterfall project and in a Scrum project: the management of stress, the use of slack and the student syndrome."

The term is said to have been introduced by Eliyahu M. Goldratt in his novel Critical Chain.

See also 
 Cramming (education)
 Hofstadter's law
 Parkinson's law
 Pygmalion effect
 Time management

References

Personal time management

pl:Syndrom studenta